Paleness may refer to:

Pallor, a medical condition
Paleness (color)

See also
Pale (disambiguation)